Earl Leonard "Sheriff" Smith (January 20, 1891 – March 13, 1943), was a Major League Baseball outfielder who played from  to  with the Chicago Cubs, St. Louis Browns, and the Washington Senators.

External links

1891 births
1943 deaths
Major League Baseball outfielders
Major League Baseball third basemen
Baseball players from Texas
St. Louis Browns players
Chicago Cubs players
Washington Senators (1901–1960) players
Green Bay Bays players
Milwaukee Brewers (minor league) players
Manistee Champs players
Milwaukee Creams players
Fond du Lac Molls players
Marinette-Menominee Twins players
Omaha Rourkes players
Minneapolis Millers (baseball) players
Topeka Kaws players
Columbus Senators players
Columbus Red Birds players
Houston Buffaloes players
Denver Bears players
Huntington Boosters players
Charleroi Tigers players
People from Oak Hill, Ohio